Behnaz Shafiei is a motocross rider and road racer from Iran, born and raised in Karaj, near Tehran, Iran. She is one of the motocross rider's in Karaj

Early life 
Shafiei's obsession started when she was on a family holiday in Zanjan, Iran. She was 15 back then and that was the first time she saw a woman on a motorbike. Shafiei went for one ride and loved it since.

Her coach, Rasoul Najafi, is an Iranian motocross champion and freestyle motorcycle rider. Apart from him, her brother also helps her out on the track. Her mother was also supportive of her passion.

Mahinkhaki said that it was a little strange to see a woman taking up biking but now he sees her potential.

She got her first bike at the age of 22, an Apache 180cc and used to ride is late in the night dressed up as a boy. She did that for about ten years while going to school in the morning to becomes an accountant. She also has a 2012 Suzuki 250cc and cbr 300cc.

Career and recognition 
In just 2015 and 2016, she trained over 100 women to drive in the dusty mountain backroads of the desert terrain in Iran. After relentlessly fighting for three years, in February 2017, she was finally able to influence the Iran's national sports ministry to conduct the country's first female-only race.

Since the Sports ministry said it is not a sport for women, she trained and increased the number of female riders. Lot of letters were written and visits to the ministry, they finally approved.

She currently trains with Javad Zanjani. Shafiei is one among the only six female racers to gained access to amateur tracks in Iran.

She is one of the female road racer in Iran and  champion motorcyclist in Iran

References 

Living people
Iranian motorcycle racers
Iranian racing drivers
Iranian sportswomen
1989 births
People from Karaj